Eugene Octave Sykes, Jr. (July 16, 1876 – June 21, 1945) was a justice on the Mississippi Supreme Court. He served as the first Chairman of the Federal Communications Commission from 1934 to 1935.

Biography
Sykes was born in Aberdeen, Mississippi on July 16, 1876 to Eugene Octave Sykes, Sr. and India Rogers. He attended St. John's College High School and the United States Naval Academy, and the University of Mississippi for his graduate degree.

He served on the Mississippi Supreme Court from 1916 to 1924, appointed by Theodore Bilbo. Calvin Coolidge appointed him to the Federal Radio Commission in 1927. He served as the first Chairman of the Federal Communications Commission from 1934 to 1935.

He died of a heart attack on June 21, 1945 in Washington, DC.

References

Further reading

External links
 

1876 births
1945 deaths
Members of the Federal Radio Commission
People from Aberdeen, Mississippi
University of Mississippi alumni
Chairmen of the Federal Communications Commission
Justices of the Mississippi Supreme Court
Franklin D. Roosevelt administration personnel